The DB Le Mans (later also sold as the René Bonnet Le Mans and René Bonnet Missile) is a fibreglass-bodied two-door sports car with front-wheel drive, built in France from 1959 until 1964. Originally equipped with Panhard two-cylinder boxers, the cars built by René Bonnet had Renault four-cylinder engines. The car, with pronounced tailfins and more comfortable than previous efforts by DB was aimed squarely at the US market.

DB Le Mans
Having met with some sales success (and many racing victories) in the United States, DB decided to tailormake a car for the US market. The more comfortable Le Mans was the result, and to underscore the intentions of the producers it had its world premiere at the 1959 Boston Motor Show. The European debut was shortly thereafter, at the 1959 Paris Motor Show. The car was a two-seater convertible built on the usual Panhard underpinnings, with the 848 cc flat-twin "Tigre" engine, capable of  SAE at 6000 rpm. The design, with its pronounced tailfins and low long nose, was the work of René Bonnet and his son Claude, as well as young designer Jacques Hubert. Charles Deutsch was preoccupied with other projects and took little interest in the Le Mans.

Production was small-scale and artisanal, with the expected resultant quality issues (although things improved as production continued). As is expected, many parts from mass-produced vehicles were used, most notably a cut-down Citroën DS windshield. Sales were reasonably good, although the price was somewhat elevated.

Grand Luxe
In an effort to target luxury car buyers and the Facel Vega Facellia, DB presented a luxurious hardtop coupé called the Le Mans Grand Luxe at the 1961 Paris Salon. While billed as a four-seater, the rear bench was best suited for luggage. The body was the same as the convertible, minus the folding roof and with a permanent hardtop installed. The hardtop's design was very similar to the roof of the Facellia, and the Marchal Mégalux double headlights were exactly the same units as used on the Facel car. Leather interior and a wooden steering wheel were standard fitment, as were power windows - unusual for a specialist manufacturer at the time. For being of such limited utility, the car was rather expensive at the time of introduction - 18,500 francs, nearly twice the price of a Citroën ID19.

René Bonnet era

After the split between Deutsch and Bonnet, René Bonnet reintroduced the Missile and the Le Mans under his own name and with Renault engines. The more luxurious Le Mans was a convertible with Renault's 1108 cc type 688 R8 engine tuned to produce . This engine was mounted ahead of the driving axle, whereas on the lower priced Missile it was mounted behind the front axle, in a front mid-engine location. The Missile, although with similar bodywork, also had single rather than the double headlights of the Le Mans. The Missile also had a lesser engine, in the form of the 845 cc type 670. The Missile has .

References

Le Mans
Cars powered by boxer engines
Convertibles
Coupés
Front-wheel-drive vehicles
1960s cars
Cars introduced in 1959